Henry John Montagu-Scott, 1st Baron Montagu of Beaulieu JP, DL (5 November 1832 – 4 November 1905), styled Lord Henry Scott until 1885, was a British Conservative Party politician.

Background and education
Montagu was the second son of Walter Montagu Douglas Scott, 5th Duke of Buccleuch and Lady Charlotte Anne Thynne, daughter of Thomas Thynne, 2nd Marquess of Bath. He was educated at Eton.

He suffered from severe asthma and it was recommended by physicians he spend the cold British winters in a warmer climate. Accordingly, from the age of 15, he and his tutor, the Rev Henry Stobart, travelled overseas each winter. These trips became longer and took them further afield. Madeira, Egypt, the West Indies, Turkey, Greece, South Africa, and the Pacific Islands were visited over the next 14 years.

In March 1853, he and his friend, Lord Schomberg Kerr, and their tutor arrived at Sydney. Young British aristocrats were rare visitors to New South Wales and Sydney matrons with unmarried daughters ensured they did not lack invitations to dinners, balls and other social events. Lord Henry made many sketches and paintings in the colony, some of which are now held by the Mitchell Library and John Oxley Library in Australia.

Political career
Montagu sat as Conservative Member of Parliament for Selkirkshire from 1861 to 1868 and for South Hampshire from 1868 to 1884. He was official Verderer of the New Forest from 1890 to 1892, and Honorary Colonel of the 4th Hampshire Rifle Volunteers from 1885. In 1885 he was raised to the peerage as Baron Montagu of Beaulieu, in the County of Southampton.

Family
Lord Montagu of Beaulieu married Hon. Cecily Susan Stuart-Wortley, daughter of John Stuart-Wortley, 2nd Baron Wharncliffe, in 1865. In 1899 Lady Montagu gave £1 to the Women's Suffrage Auxiliary Fund of the Englishwoman's Review. They had two sons and one daughter, the Honourable Rachel Cecily Montagu-Scott, wife of Henry Forster, 1st Baron Forster.

References

 Who Was Who

External links 
 

Montagu of Beaulieu, Henry John Douglas-Scott-Montagu, 1st Baron
Montagu of Beaulieu, Henry John Douglas-Scott-Montagu, 1st Baron
Montagu of Beaulieu, Henry John Douglas-Scott-Montagu, 1st Baron
Douglas-Scott-Montagu, Henry John
Douglas-Scott-Montagu, Henry John
Montagu of Beaulieu, Henry John Douglas-Scott-Montagu, 1st Baron
Douglas-Scott-Montagu, Henry John
Douglas-Scott-Montagu, Henry John
Douglas-Scott-Montagu, Henry John
Douglas-Scott-Montagu, Henry John
Douglas-Scott-Montagu, Henry John
UK MPs who were granted peerages
Henry
Henry
Deputy Lieutenants of Hampshire
Peers of the United Kingdom created by Queen Victoria